The Gymnasium is a high school for men and women (formerly for men) belonging to the National University of Tucumán, located in San Miguel de Tucumán, Argentina. It is characterized by its humanistic orientation, using a system of self-discipline, a mentoring scheme and the wide participation that students have in it. The Gymnasium is designed to prepare students for university life, but also goes beyond the academic system. This special training is given because, as well as some teachers have a deeper learning, these students act as mentors to their pairs. Supports of this education system are primarily the student or teacher mentoring, and organizational bodies such as the College Club, the Board of Representatives or of the Advisory Council. This organizational system allows students to acquire skills of organization, interaction and extensive human and a democratic vision. The historic actions of the students in the Gymnasium has been very favorable for youth in the province since it emerged in the popular traditions such as Camps (1948), Study Tours (1950), own magazine (The Chasqui, 1951) and the "Celebration Week" (1957). The Gymnasium is an institution of self development for the student, as well as a preparation for life itself, hence the obligatory subject of Ethics Formation.

References

1948 establishments in Argentina
Argentine national universities
Education in Tucumán Province
Educational institutions established in 1948